Edwardsville Senior High School is a public high school located in Edwardsville, Illinois.

History 
Edwardsville High School was first located on North Kansas Street in downtown Edwardsville. Due to the expansion of the town, a new high school was commissioned in 1921. Today, the first building is Columbus Elementary School. 
The second Edwardsville High School was completed in 1925, on 145 West Street. Rather than rebuild a bigger school, it was expanded over the years to meet the demands of the growing school district.

In 1993, Edwardsville High school was unable to be expanded any longer, and a motion was passed to turn the old High School into a middle school, and build a new state of the art High School at 6161 Center Grove Road. 
The current Edwardsville High School complex was completed in 1996 by the Korte Company and began regular use in 1997

Incidents
The school has been the target of several bomb threats, most notably in 2004, 2010, 2014, and 2018.

In November 2019, several fights broke out due to racial posts on Snapchat.

Notable alumni
 Jason Boyd, former MLB player (Pittsburgh Pirates, Philadelphia Phillies, San Diego Padres, Cleveland Indians)
 Rodney Coe, former NFL player
 A. J. Epenesa, NFL defensive end (Buffalo Bills) 
 Justin Hampson, Former MLB player (Colorado Rockies, San Diego Padres, New York Mets)
 Barb Honchak - professional Mixed Martial Artist, inaugural Invicta FC Flyweight Champion, currently competing in the UFC
 Mannie Jackson, All-American college basketball guard for Illinois Fighting Illini from 1957–60, 1st African-American owner of major sports corporation (Harlem Globetrotters), Naismith Basketball Hall of Fame Inductee, 2002
 Craig James, NFL player
 Mark Little, Former MLB player (St. Louis Cardinals, Colorado Rockies, New York Mets, Arizona Diamondbacks, Cleveland Indians)
 Laurie Metcalf, Emmy-award-winning actress, known for roles on TV's Roseanne and the Toy Story movies
 Don Ohl, college basketball guard for Illinois Fighting Illini from 1955–58, 5th round 1958 NBA draft pick by the Philadelphia Warriors, 5x NBA All-Star from 1963-1967
 Riley Patterson, NFL player
 Vincent Valentine (American football), current Defensive Lineman for the NFL's New England Patriots.
 Govoner Vaughn, All-American college basketball forward for Illinois Fighting Illini from 1957–60

References

1921 establishments in Illinois
Educational institutions established in 1921
Public high schools in Illinois
Schools in Madison County, Illinois